Ali Gul Pir (born 14 February 1986) is a Pakistani rapper, television and voice actor, Brand ambassador and stand-up comedian. He achieved popularity with his first single, "Waderai Ka Beta", a comedy song about political elites in Pakistan at the helm of affairs and the culture surrounding it.

Early life
Ali Gul Pir was born to a feudal lord family of Dadu District.

Career 
Ali Gul Pir started his career as an actor in stand-up comedy roles later turning into a singer. His political and social debut single Waderai Ka Beta was popular, with half a million hits on YouTube within a week of its release in June 2012.

He was nominated as the Best Newcomer in Music category of 1st Hum Awards on 12 March 2013.

Discography 
  Waderai Ka Beta - 2012
 Saeen To Saeen - 2012
 Taroo Maroo - 2013
 VIP - 2013
 Kholo BC with Adil Omar - 2014
 Justice - 2014
 Kaisa Diya? - 2014
 Dance the Party with Shuja Haider for film Jawani Phir Nahi Ani - 2015
 Chutti Time - 2016
 Modi Teri - 2016
 Kerlay Jo Kerna Hai - 2020

TV commercials
 Djuice
 Hardee's
 Yayvo TCS
 Olpers Lassi
 Ufone
 Total Hi-Perf

Filmography
 3 Bahadur: The Revenge of Baba Balaam (2016)

References

External links 
 AliGulPir.com
 
1986 births
Living people
Pakistani rappers
Sindhi rappers
Pakistani male singers
Pakistani satirists
Pakistani stand-up comedians
Comedians from Karachi
Sindhi people
Singers from Karachi
Pakistani male comedians
Comedians from Sindh
Pakistani male voice actors
Pakistani landowners
People from Dadu District
Ali Gul Pir on Instagram